The 2020 Utah Attorney General election was held on November 3, 2020 to elect the Attorney General of Utah. The election was held alongside various federal and state elections, including for governor. Incumbent Attorney General Sean Reyes won re-election to a third term, defeating Democratic nominee Greg Skordas and Libertarian nominee Rudy Bautista.

The conventions for the Republican, Democratic and Libertarian parties were held on April 25. Although originally planned to be held in-person, all three conventions were moved online due to the COVID-19 pandemic.

Republican primary

Candidates

Nominee 
 Sean Reyes, incumbent Attorney General

Eliminated in primary 
 David O. Leavitt, Utah County district attorney

Eliminated at convention 
 John Swallow, former Attorney General

Convention 
Voting began for the convention on April 23, with results being announced on April 27.

Results

Primary

Endorsements

Polling

Results

Democratic convention

Candidates

Nominee 
 Greg Skordas, nominee for Attorney General in 2004

Eliminated at convention 

Libertarian convention

Candidates

Nominee 
 Rudy Bautista, defense attorney

General election

Predictions

Polling

Results

References 

Attorney General
Utah
Utah Attorney General elections